Britons in Japan make up one of the slightly larger foreign resident communities in Japan.

Overview
As of June 2022, according to data released by the Ministry of Justice Immigration Bureau, there were 17,311 people from the United Kingdom who were classified as either permanent or long-term residents in Japan.

Professional associations
The British Chamber of Commerce in Japan is an independent non-profit organisation that promotes trade and networking opportunities for member firms and business professionals living and working in Japan.

Education
The British School in Tokyo provides an English language based educational curriculum for students of over 50 different nationalities and serves a number of children of British heritage living in the city.

See also
 United Kingdom–Japan relations
 Japanese in the United Kingdom
 British Embassy, Tokyo

References

British diaspora in Asia
European diaspora in Japan
Japan